The Nevada Poetry Association (OPA) is a non-profit state-level poetry association in the U.S. state of Nevada, which is affiliated with the National Federation of State Poetry Societies (NFSPS). The organization promotes poetry, conducts contests, publishes poetry books and organizes periodic meetings, workshops and festivals.

History

The Nevada Poetry Society was established by Mildred Breedlove in 1961, and has sponsored and developed poets over the years since. The society's archives are housed at the University of Nevada, Las Vegas. University Libraries.

Activities

The Nevada Poetry Society promotes poetry in the state, conduct an annual cycle of contests, publishes poetry anthologies and organizes periodic conferences, meetings, workshops and festivals. The society releases member publications, and has also published calendars and a cookbook. The organization has been a strong supporter for a Nevada state Poet Laureate.

References

External links

Poetry organizations
Literary societies
1961 establishments in Nevada
Non-profit organizations based in Nevada
501(c)(3) organizations
Arts organizations established in 1961